White Rock Township may refer to:

White Rock Township, Franklin County, Arkansas
White Rock Township, Ogle County, Illinois
White Rock Township, Lane County, Kansas
White Rock Township, Republic County, Kansas
White Rock Township, Smith County, Kansas
White Rock Township, McDonald County, Missouri
White Rock Township, Noble County, Oklahoma
White Rock Township, Roberts County, South Dakota

Township name disambiguation pages